A hawker centre or cooked food centre is an open-air complex commonly found in Hong Kong, Malaysia and Singapore. They were built to provide a more sanitary alternative to mobile hawker carts and contain many stalls that sell different varieties of affordable meals. Dedicated tables and chairs are usually provided for diners.

Such centres are usually managed by a governing authority which maintains the facility and rents out stores for hawkers to ply their goods.

By countries or regions

Hong Kong

In Hong Kong, most cooked food centres (熟食中心; or cooked food markets, 熟食市場) are either located in market complexes of residential districts, or as a standalone structure (this being the case in most industrial areas), with only a few exceptions (e.g. Mong Kok Cooked Food Market is located in the lower levels of Langham Place Hotel). Cooked food centres are managed by Food and Environmental Hygiene Department.

Most of the stalls from hawker centres are converted from former dai pai dong by strict regulations and management; the Hong Kong Government regards the provision of cooked food centres as a way to eliminate traditional dai pai dongs from local streets in the 1970s. During the industrial boom in the 1960s and 1970s, the government also built cooked food markets in industrial areas to serve the catering needs of the working class in major industrial centres such as Kwun Tong, Tsuen Wan and Fo Tan.

Stalls in cooked food centres usually provide local cuisine, with those selling exotic delicacies a minority.

Malaysia

During the 1950s, the British were concerned about the economic influence of the hawkers and kept them under surveillance. In response to the government's plan to curb the activities of the Kuala Lumpur Hawkers and Petty Traders Association, its members threatened to take up arms and participate in the Malaysian Emergency against the government, leading the latter to back down. 

In the next decade, the association became part of the system and actively promoted the hawkers' interests where necessary. By the 1960s, however, the authorities began to crack down on illegal activities and unlicensed hawkers. Health and safety considerations also became paramount to the authorities as the hawkers had little sanitary considerations and frequently occupied the streets with their wares, even after being fined.

In 1967, the first two hawker centers in Malaysia were built in Kuala Lumpur as part of a programme to improve hygiene standards and clear the roads of streetside stores. While initially reluctant, the hawkers eventually moved to these facilities. However, many continue to operate in other areas, with operation in hawker centres being one of seven types of hawker licences issued by Kuala Lumpur.

In the state of Penang, most hawkers were also moved into fixed locations as hygiene and traffic concerns grew. Some temporary or mobile fixtures remain, however licences to do so can only be renewed, with no new licences for mobile hawking being offered. Moving to fixed locations is often unpopular with hawkers, who fear losing customers and the higher fees needed. Labour shortages in the 1980s and 1990s led to many hawker centres being staffed by foreigners. In 2014, after it was reported that in 68 hawker centres 119 foreign cooks were identified, a law banning foreign cooks was proposed and gathered support, finally being passed in 2016. This was purported as a move to protect Penang's heritage, and 13 dishes were declared by the government as heritage dishes; 10 were of Chinese origin, 2 of Tamil origin, and 1 of Malay origin. Foreigners were still able to work as assistants, or as cooks in restaurants.

Cooks working in hawker centres are mainly older individuals, challenging the sustainability of the business. Hawking is viewed, including by many hawkers, as low-status and low-paying. The COVID-19 pandemic led to further challenges. The Penang government pledged to restore the Gurney Drive hawker centre, considered the most well-known, which had previously relied on both domestic and international tourists. Overall business in Penang's hawker centres decreased by 50%, as national regulations limited their opening hours.

Singapore

Hawker centres sprang up in urban areas following the rapid urbanisation in the 1950s and 1960s. In many cases, they were built partly to address the problem of unhygienic food preparation by unlicensed street hawkers. More recently, they have become less ubiquitous due to growing affluence in the urban populations of Malaysia and Singapore. Particularly in Singapore, they are increasingly being replaced by food courts, which are indoor, air conditioned versions of hawker centres located in shopping malls and other commercial venues.

In the 1950s and 1960s, hawker centres were considered to be a venue for the less affluent. They had a reputation for unhygienic food, partly due to the frequent appearance of stray domestic pets and pests. Many hawker centres were poorly managed by their operators, often lacking running water and proper facilities for cleaning. More recently, hygiene standards have improved, with pressure from the local authorities. This includes the implementation of licensing requirements, where a sufficient standard of hygiene is required for the stall to operate, and rewarding exceptionally good hygiene. A score of 85% or higher results in an A, and the lowest grade is a D, which ranges from 40 to 49% passing standards. These grades are required to be displayed on hawker stands. Upgrading or reconstruction of hawker centres was initiated in the 1990s in Singapore.

In 1987, a point demerit system was introduced to account for stand's food and personal handing hygiene. Six demerit points yield a US$400 fee (HK$2470). Individual fines will be solicited for larger violations such as putting unclean materials in contact with the food. Failure to display issued license will result in a US$200 fine.

The hawker centres in Singapore are owned by three government bodies, namely the National Environment Agency (NEA) under the parent Ministry of Sustainability and the Environment (MSE), Housing and Development Board (HDB) and JTC Corporation. All the centres owned by HDB and NEA, in turn, are regulated by NEA with the individual Town Councils managing the HDB owned centres. JTC owned centres are self-managed.

In 2011, Singapore announced plans to develop 10 hawker centers, which equates to 600 stalls in the next decade. This will stabilise food prices and reduce rent of hawker stands over time.

As of 2016, two Singaporean food stalls, both located in hawker centres, became the first street food vendors to be awarded a Michelin Star for excellence in eating. The two stalls are Hong Kong Soya Sauce Chicken Rice and Noodle and Hill Street Tai Hwa Pork Noodle. As of 2019, more than 40 hawker stalls were awarded Michelin Star and Bib Gourmand in Singapore. 

In 2019, Singapore submitted its nomination to inscribe its hawker culture on the UNESCO Representative List of the Intangible Cultural Heritage of Humanity. Inscription was announced on 16 December 2020, when UNESCO described the hawker centre as "‘community dining rooms’ where people from diverse backgrounds gather and share the experience of dining over breakfast, lunch and dinner."

With effect from 1 September 2021, it is a littering offence now to leave behind food trays, crockery, used tissues, wet wipes, drink straws, food wrappers, drink cans, plastic water bottles, food remnants and any other litters at hawker centres. First-time offenders will be issued a written warning. Second-time offenders will face a composition fine of $300 and subsequent offenders may face court fines under the Environmental Public Health Act.

Urban Hawker (New York City)
On September 21, 2022, a Singaporean-style hawker centre opened in Manhattan, New York City. It was first mooted in 2013 by American chef Anthony Bourdain after visiting Singapore, and he collaborated with Singaporean chef K.F. Seetoh. Seetoh took up the mantle after Bourdain's death in 2018. Known as the Urban Hawker, it consists of traditional Singaporean dishes, with most of the vendors hailing from Singapore.

See also

 Cha chaan teng Hong Kong diner
 Dhaba Indian roadside diner
 Diner American roadside dining
 Hawker (trade)
 Kopi tiam, Malayan coffee shop
 Pasar malam, Malayan night market
 Food court western style
 Greasy spoon in the US and Britain
 Mamak stall Malayan road stall
 Truck stop in North America
 Night market

References

External links
Public Markets and Cooked Food Centres in Hong Kong  – fehd.gov.hk

Restaurants by type
Restaurants in Hong Kong
Restaurants in Malaysia
Singaporean culture